Luljeta is an Albanian feminine given name, which means "flower of life". "Given Name Luljeta". Retrieved on 28 January. According to dervorname.com the name is most populuar in Albania with 7809 people followed Kosovo with 4696 people and Grecce with 719 people. The name may refer to:

Luljeta Bitri (born 1976), Albanian actress, director and producer
Luljeta Lleshanaku (born 1968), Albanian poet

References

Albanian feminine given names